Ödön Singer (14 October 1830 – 23 January 1912), also known as Edmund Singer, was a Hungarian violinist.

He was born in Tata, Hungary in 1830 and studied under Joseph Böhm in Vienna. He was a childhood friend of Joseph Joachim. In 1854 he became concertmaster of the Weimar orchestra. He died in Stuttgart, Germany in 1912.

External links

References

Hungarian classical violinists
Concertmasters
Male classical violinists
1830 births
1912 deaths